= Munford W. Radford =

American state legislator

Munford Washington Radford (1826—1887) was a state legislator in Virginia. He represented Bedford County, Virginia in the Virginia House of Delegates from 1871 through 1873.

Radford attended the University of Virginia in 1843 and 1844.

He married Elizabeth Read. Laura Sommerville or Somerville was his second wife. Scholar Robert Somerville Radford was one of their children.
